Philippe Grivel (born 29 June 1964) is a Swiss former cyclist. He competed in the points race at the 1988 Summer Olympics.

References

External links
 

1964 births
Living people
Swiss male cyclists
Olympic cyclists of Switzerland
Cyclists at the 1988 Summer Olympics
Place of birth missing (living people)